HD 33266 (HR 1675) is a solitary star in the northern circumpolar constellation Camelopardalis. It has an apparent magnitude of 6.17, making it faintly visible to the naked eye.

HD 33266 is an A-type star with 2.45 times the mass of the Sun and 3.14 times the radius of the Sun. Its metallicity − elements heavier than helium − is at solar level.

Note

References

Camelopardalis (constellation)
A-type stars
33266
024313
1675
Durchmusterung objects